Turaif is a town in Northern Borders Province (also known as Al-Hudud ash Shamaliyah), Saudi Arabia, close to the border with Jordan. Turaif is located at a bend in Highway 85 as it turns west to Jordan. As of 2010, it has a population of 48,929. The city of Turaif is one of the cities that have been established because of the presence of the Trans-Arabian Pipeline.

Highway 85 bisects Turaif into "Old" Turaif to the north and "New" Turaif to the south. The largest hotel in Turaif is the Al-Mudwah Hotel and SWISS SPIRIT located along Highway 85 as it cuts through the town.

Other nearby airports are Gurayat Domestic Airport in Gurayat (Qurayyat) and Arar Domestic Airport in Arar.

Climate
Turaif has hot desert climate (Köppen climate classification: BWh) with long, very hot summers and cool winters. Frost is not unheard of in the winter months. Snow may also fall at times .

References

Populated places in Northern Borders Province